Khutughtu Khan , born Kuśala (Mongolian: Хүслэн ; ,  means virtuous/wholesome), also known by the temple name Mingzong (Emperor Mingzong of Yuan, ; 22 December  1300 – 30 August 1329), was a son of Khayishan who seized the throne of the Yuan dynasty of China in 1329, but died soon after. Apart from the Emperor of China, he is considered as the 13th Great Khan of the Mongol Empire, although it was only nominal due to the division of the empire.

Early life and exile 
He was the eldest son of Khayishan (Külüg Khan or Emperor Wuzong) and a Mongol-Ikhires woman. Due to the unstable balance present in the Khayishan administration with the tense rivalry between Khayishan, his younger brother Ayurbarwada and their mother Dagi of the Khunggirad clan, Khayishan appointed Ayurbarwada as Crown Prince on the condition that he would pass the status to Kuśala after succession.

However, after Khayishan's death, Ayurbarwada succeeded to the throne in 1311. In 1320, Dagi, Temüder and other members of the Khunggirad faction installed Ayurbarwada's son Shidebala as the new ruler instead of Kuśala, due to the knowledge of Kuśala coming from an Ikhires background, rather than the more noble Khunggirad lineage.

To ensure Shidebala's succession, Kuśala was rewarded with the title of king of Chou and relegated to Yunnan in 1316; but fled to Esen Bukha-ruled Chagatai Khanate in Central Asia, as a pro-Khayishan official advised, after a failed revolt in Shaanxi. When the Chagatayid Khan Esen Bukha heard that Kuśala was living near his realm, he came to greet him. After that, Kusala was backed by the Chagatayid princes. While in exile in Central Asia, he married Mailaiti, a daughter of Temuder of the Qarluq.

Brief accession and sudden death 

Although the rival faction was purged by Yesün Temür Khan (Emperor Taiding) when Shidibala Khan (Emperor Yingzong) was assassinated, he remained in Central Asia. He extended his influence in his stronghold, which was located to the west of Altai Mountains.

In 1328, when Yesün Temür Khan died, a civil war known as the War of the Two Capitals erupted between Shangdu-based Ragibagh and Dadu-based Tugh Temür. The former was a son of Yesün Temür and was backed up the former Yesün Temür administration led by Dawlat Shah, and the latter was Kuśala's younger brother who was supported by the former Khayishan faction led by the Qipchaq commander El Temür and the Merkit commander Bayan, a governor in Henan. This ended in the victory of Tugh Temür since he secured support from most of the princes, aristocrats and warlords in the south of the Gobi Desert. Tugh Temür summoned his brother to come to Dadu.

At the same time, Kuśala, with support from the Chaghadayid leaders Eljigidey and Duwa Temür, entered Mongolia from the Tarbagatai region (in the Khangai Mountains). He also got support from princes and generals of Mongolia, and with overwhelming military power in the background, put pressure on Tugh Temür, who had already ascended the throne. Kuśala enthroned himself on 27 February 1329, north of Karakorum.

Tugh Temür abdicated on 3 April 1329, and a month later El Temür brought the imperial seal to Kuśala in Mongolia, announcing Dadu's intent to welcome him. Kuśala responded by making Tugh Temür his heir apparent on 15 May. Kuśala had proceeded to appoint his own loyal followers to important posts in the Secretariat, the Bureau of Military Affairs, and the Censorate.

Taking 1,800 men with him, Kuśala set out for Dadu. On 26 August, he met with Tugh Temür in Ongghuchad (Onggachatu), where Tugh Temur had built the city of Zhongdu. He suddenly died only 4 days after a banquet with Tugh Temür. The Yuan shi states that the luckless Kuśala Khan died of violence. It seems that Kuśala was poisoned by El Temür, who feared losing power to princes and officers of the Chagatai Khanate and Mongolia, who followed Kuśala. Tugh Temür was restored to the throne on 8 September.

Family 

Khutughtu Khan had two wives who were Mailaiti, a descendant of the famous Qarluq chief, Arslan, who submitted to Genghis Khan and Babusha of the Naiman. They gave birth to two Mongol emperors, including Toghon Temür, the last Mongolian emperor to rule China.

 Parents:
 Külüg, Emperor Wuzong (4 August 1281 – 27 January 1311)
 Concubine Shoutong 
 Wives and children:
 Empress Zhenyuhuisheng of Karluks  (d. 1320), personal name Mailaiti (迈来迪)
 Toghon Temür, Emperor Huizong (25 May 1320 – 23 May 1370), first son
 Empress Anchuhan
 Empress Yuelusha
 Princess Changguo
 Empress Buyanhuludou
 Empress Yesu
 Empress Tuohusi
 Empress Babusha of the Naiman  (d. 1330)
 Rinchinbal, Emperor Ningzong (1 May 1326 – 14 December 1332), second son
 Unknown
 Princess Minghui Zhenyi, personal name Budaxini

See also
 List of Yuan emperors
 List of Mongol rulers
 List of Chinese monarchs

References 
Ч.Далай – Монголын түүх 1260–1388
Д.Цэен-Ойдов  – Чингис богдоос Лигдэн хутагт хүртэл монголын хаад

Great Khans of the Mongol Empire
Yuan dynasty emperors
Yuan dynasty Buddhists
Chinese Buddhist monarchs
14th-century Chinese monarchs
14th-century Mongol rulers
1300 births
1329 deaths
Murdered Chinese emperors
Mongolian Buddhist monarchs